Green Party Korea is a political party in South Korea. The party was established in March 2012. It is a continuation of the Korea Greens, created following initial discussions in 2011. The party was established in response to the Fukushima Nuclear Crisis of Japan. Green Party Korea is a member of the Global Greens and the Asia Pacific Greens Federation. As a result of the party only getting 0.48% in the 19th national parliamentary election in April 2012, the party was disbanded by the National Election Administration Office.

However, the paragraph 4 of article 41 and the subparagraph 3 of paragraph 1 of article 44 of the Political Parties Act, which had revoked registration of parties and banned use of the titles of the parties whose obtained numbers of votes had been less than 2% of the total number of effective votes, were ruled unconstitutional by the Constitutional Court of Korea on 28 January 2014. As a result, Green Party Korea recovered its title.

Green Party Korea, together with the Basic Income Youth Network, began a two-week tour on 6 July 2015 to discover the opinions citizens in South Korea have about basic income, and to introduce the concept of basic income to the community. The party has also adopted basic income as part of their party platform.

Attributes of the Party
The party has more females than males.  About 38.2% of party members are in their 40s.  24.8% of party members are 50 years of age or older.

Election results

Legislature

Local

See also
Energy in South Korea
Environment of South Korea
List of environmental organizations
Politics of South Korea
Political parties in South Korea

References

External links

Korea Greens on Daum Cafe

2004 establishments in South Korea
Anti-nationalism in Korea
Anti-nuclear organizations
Direct democracy parties
Environment of South Korea
Feminist organizations in South Korea
Feminist parties in Asia
Global Greens member parties
Green parties in Asia
Immigration political advocacy groups in South Korea
LGBT political advocacy groups in South Korea
Participatory democracy
Political parties established in 2004
Political parties supporting universal basic income
Progressive parties in South Korea
Universal basic income in South Korea